Lyndonville is a village in Orleans County, New York, United States. The population was 838 at the 2010 census. The name was selected because some of the early settlers were from Lyndon, Vermont. It is part of the Rochester Metropolitan Statistical Area.

The Village of Lyndonville is within the borders of the Town of Yates.

History 
The early settlers moved from Yates Center (north of Lyndonville) to take advantage of water power provided by Johnson's Creek. One of the early settlers was Jackson Blood, whose cobblestone house was listed on the National Register of Historic Places in 2005.

The Village of Lyndonville was incorporated in 1903, separating itself from the Town of Yates.

Geography
Lyndonville is located at  (43.323786, -78.387697).

Lyndonville is located on north–south highway New York State Route 63 (North and South Main Street), south of its intersection with New York State Route 18. It is also about four miles south of Lake Ontario.

Johnson's Creek flows through the village.

Demographics

As of the census of 2000, there were 862 people, 325 households, and 228 families residing in the village. The population density was 841.7 people per square mile (326.3/km2). There were 344 housing units at an average density of 335.9 per square mile (130.2/km2). The racial makeup of the village was 98.14% White, 0.23% African American, 0.46% Asian, 0.70% from other races, and 0.46% from two or more races. Hispanic or Latino of any race were 1.51% of the population.

There were 325 households, out of which 37.5% had children under the age of 18 living with them, 52.0% were married couples living together, 10.2% had a female householder with no husband present, and 29.8% were non-families. 25.2% of all households were made up of individuals, and 15.1% had someone living alone who was 65 years of age or older. The average household size was 2.65 and the average family size was 3.12.

In the village, the population was spread out, with 29.4% under the age of 18, 8.9% from 18 to 24, 25.9% from 25 to 44, 21.3% from 45 to 64, and 14.5% who were 65 years of age or older. The median age was 36 years. For every 100 females, there were 95.5 males. For every 100 females age 18 and over, there were 90.3 males.

The median income for a household in the village was $40,179, and the median income for a family was $45,500. Males had a median income of $35,769 versus $19,464 for females. The per capita income for the village was $16,357. About 5.9% of families and 9.3% of the population were below the poverty line, including 12.7% of those under age 18 and 8.4% of those age 65 or over.

Notable churches 
Lyndonville has three churches within the village, the Lyndonville United Methodist, the Lyndonville Presbyterian, and Our Lady of the Lake St. Joseph Roman Catholic Church. Lyndonville is also home to a large Amish and Mennonite population.

Notable people
Technical Sergeant Forrest L. Vosler (29 July 1923 – 17 February 1992), who was awarded the Medal of Honor for his actions during World War II, was born here.

Staff Sergeant David Bellavia The first living recipient from the Iraq war to receive the Medal of Honor was raised here.

References

External links
  RW&O Railroad Station, Lyndonville, NY
  History of Lyndonville and surrounding area

Villages in New York (state)
Rochester metropolitan area, New York
Villages in Orleans County, New York